Rychlak is a surname. Notable people with the surname include:

 Gene Rychlak (1968–2019), American powerlifter
 Joseph F. Rychlak (1928–2013), psychologist
 Ronald J. Rychlak (born 1957), American lawyer and author

See also
 
Rychlik (disambiguation)

Polish-language surnames